Regan Smith could refer to:

 Regan Smith (racing driver) (born 1983), American professional stock car racing driver and a pit reporter
 Regan Smith (swimmer) (born 2002), American competitive swimmer

See also
 Ragan Smith (born 2000), American gymnast